North Carolina's 11th House district is one of 120 districts in the North Carolina House of Representatives. It has been represented by Democrat Allison Dahle since 2019.

Geography
Since 2013, the district has included part of Wake County. The district overlaps with the 15th and 17th Senate districts.

District officeholders since 1993

Multi-member district

Single-member district

Election results

2022

2020

2018

2016

2014

2012

2010

2008

2006

2004

2002

2000

References

North Carolina House districts
Wake County, North Carolina